Charles Humphrey (February 14, 1792 – April 17, 1850) was an American lawyer and politician from New York. He served as a U.S. Representative and as Speaker of the New York State Assembly.

Life
He was born in Little Britain, Orange County, New York, but moved to Newburgh, New York, at an early age and attended the Newburgh Academy. Then he studied law. He entered the United States Army at the beginning of the War of 1812 as First Sergeant of Newburgh Company Number Five. He was commissioned a captain in the Forty-first Regiment, United States Infantry, on August 15, 1813. After the war he resumed the study of law, and was admitted to the bar in Newburgh, New York on January 11, 1816. He moved to Ithaca, New York in 1818, and engaged in the practice of law.

Humphrey was elected as an Adams candidate to the Nineteenth Congress, and served from March 4, 1825 to March 3, 1827.

He served as president of the village of Ithaca in 1828 and 1829. He was elected Surrogate of Tompkins County, New York, and served from March 4, 1831, to January 8, 1834.

He was a member from Tompkins County of the New York State Assembly from 1834 to 1836, when he was active in studying prison reform as well as education, and in 1842, and was Speaker in 1835 and 1836.

He was appointed clerk of the New York Supreme Court in 1843 and held that position until 1847.

Humphrey married Ann Eliza Belknap (1797–1861) in Newburgh, New York in 1816. The couple had seven children, three of whom survived to adulthood: William Ross Humphrey (1820–1901), Charles D. Humphrey (1832–1870), and Sarah B. Humphrey Judd (1835–1904).

He died in Albany, Albany County, New York, and was buried at the City Cemetery in Ithaca, N.Y.

Charles Humphrey is the namesake of Humphrey, New York.

References

 Retrieved on 2009-5-16

Sources
 Political Graveyard
 Google Books = John Stilwell Jenkins: History of Political Parties in the State of New-York (Alden & Markham, Auburn NY, 1846)
Selkreg, John H, Landmarks of Tompkins County, New York. Syracuse: D. Mason & Company, 1894.

1792 births
1850 deaths
19th-century American politicians
National Republican Party members of the United States House of Representatives from New York (state)
People from New Windsor, New York
Politicians from Ithaca, New York
Speakers of the New York State Assembly
Democratic Party members of the New York State Assembly
United States Army officers
United States Army personnel of the War of 1812